Bloomfield is an unincorporated community in Prince County, Prince Edward Island, Canada.

Bloomfield Provincial Park is located here.

Bloomfield is the birthplace of Mary Josephine Ray.

References

Communities in Prince County, Prince Edward Island